For the state pageant affiliated with Miss Teen USA, see Miss Kentucky Teen USA

The Miss Kentucky's Teen competition is the pageant that selects the representative for the U.S. state of Kentucky for the Miss America's Teen pageant.

Annie Dauk of Louisville was crowned Miss Kentucky's Outstanding Teen on June 18, 2022 at the Brown Theater in Louisville, Kentucky. She competed for the title of Miss America's Outstanding Teen 2023 at the Hyatt Regency Dallas in Dallas, Texas on August 12, 2022 where she placed in the Top 11, and won a Preliminary Talent award.

In January of 2023, the official name of the pageant was changed from Miss Kentucky's Outstanding Teen, to Miss Kentucky’s Teen, in accordance with the national pageant.

Results summary 
The following is a visual summary of the past results of Miss Kentucky's Outstanding Teen titleholders presented in the table below. The year in parentheses indicates year of the Miss America's Outstanding Teen competition in which the placement and/or award was garnered.

Placements 
 2nd runners-up: Landry Feldmeier (2020)
 4th runners-up: Ann-Blair Thornton (2008)
 Top 10: Laura Jones (2011)
 Top 11: Annie Dauk (2023)

Awards

Preliminary awards 
 Preliminary Evening Wear/On-Stage Question: Laura Jones (2011)
 Preliminary Talent: Annie Dauk (2023)

Non-finalist awards 
 Non-finalist Talent: Lauren Bohl (2013), Chapel Tinius (2017)

Other awards 

 Outstanding Instrumental Talent: Laura Jones (2011), Lauren Bohl (2013), Chapel Tinius (2017)

Winners

References

External links
 Official website

Kentucky
Kentucky culture
Women in Kentucky
Annual events in Kentucky